Boyd E. Georgi (January 20, 1914 - October 19, 1999) was a USC-trained California architect with a Southern California practice in modernism that spanned from residential works to schools and libraries. Georgi was president of the Pasadena and Foothill chapter of the AIA in 1964.

Georgi is known for a number of important late modernist houses and other buildings in the California area. Georgi's most significant largely-unmodified work is the Altadena library main branch (1967).

Georgi also taught at the USC School of Architecture.

References

Architects from California
20th-century American architects
1914 births
1999 deaths
University of Southern California alumni